The Heldburger Gangschar is a Cenozoic volcanic system in the Franconian parts of southern Thuringia and northern Bavaria. The term Gangschar refers to the fact that few of the volcanoes have retained their characteristic topographical shape, rather their former activity can be detected by filled fissures known as Gänge ("[mineral] veins"). These veins are mostly oriented in south-southwest direction, their cross-section is often less than one metre wide. The Heldburger Gangschar''' is named after the small settlement of Heldburg, part of the borough of Bad Colberg-Heldburg. The surrounding area, the Heldburger Land, belongs entirely to the northern part of the volcanic zone.
The most impressive of the surviving volcanic cones by far are the twin peaks of the Gleichberge, 641 metres and 679 metres high, in nearby Heldburger Land.

 Location 

 
The Heldburger Gangschar'' is not a self-contained landscape and is distributed mainly over the main physiographic units Grabfeld, Itz-Baunach Hill Country and Haßberge Hills. South of the river Main their former activity is also detectable in the northern Steigerwald and Franconian Jura. Its core zone extends from Hildburghausen to Gerolzhofen.

Volcanic cones 
The following are the best known, preserved volcanic cones, together with details of their height, approximate age and rock in brackets:
 Großer Gleichberg ( 679 m, 15 million years old, Alkaliolivinbasalt ) — situated in Grabfeld
 Kleiner Gleichberg ( 641 m) — situated in Grabfeld
 Bramberg (495 m, 15 million years old, alkali olivine basalt) — situated in the Hassberge
 Zeilberg ( 463 m, 16 million years old, nepheline-basanite) — situated in Itz-Baunach-Hügelland
 Straufhain ( 449 m ) - situated in the Itz-Baunach Hill Country — Heldburger Land
 Veste Heldburg(mountain) (405 m, 12 million years old, phonolite-olivine-tephrite vein) — situated in the Itz-Baunach Hill Country - Heldburger Land
Older volcanoes such as the Oberleinleiter in the Franconian Jura (31 million years old, olivine-melilite-nephelinite and olivine-nephelinite) are no longer recognizable as such by their topography. Although the latter reaches a height of 505 metres, it is overshadowed by the Jurassic rocks of the Alps.

Literature 
 Gerd Geyer, Hermann Schmidt-Kaler: Coburger Land und Heldburger Gangschar: Wanderungen in die Erdgeschichte; Verlaf Pfeil;  
 Norbert Klaus Fuchs: Das Heldburger Land – ein historischer Reiseführer. Verlag Rockstuhl, Bad Langensalza 2013, .

References 

Tertiary volcanoes
Geology of Germany